Rakovica is a village in the municipality of Bosanska Dubica, Bosnia and Herzegovina.

References

Populated places in Dubica, Bosnia and Herzegovina